Bahamas sent a delegation to compete at the 1976 Summer Paralympics in Toronto, Ontario, Canada. Its athletes failed in winning any medal and finished last along 7 other countries.

See also 
 1976 Summer Paralympics
 Bahamas at the 1976 Summer Olympics

References 

Nations at the 1976 Summer Paralympics
1976
Paralympics